Jung Yu-ri (born December 6, 1984), or Yu-ri, is a South Korean singer. She debuted in 2001 with her album Just Like R&B. She released the album Seurureuk (스르륵) on June 6 using the stage name AB.

Career

Debut
At the 2000 Cyber Music Festival, she entered a contest as a participant and was noticed for her voice. Immediately compared to Japanese singer Hikaru Utada since during the time she performed R&B music and wrote her own songs. She debuted at the age of 18 with her first album Just Like R&B. Despite not getting the expected success, she would collaborate with artists like: MC Sniper, Stony Skunk and Honey Family.

2006–2010: First singles
In October 2006, she released her first single titled 1st Single. She went on to find more opportunities again by collaborating with MC Sniper, Rhymer, Main Stream, Namolla Family before releasing her second album The Ring of Diamond in April 2008. This album was different from her first as she sings Pop and Ballad music instead of R&B. In November, she released her commercial single Yepp Song (Music Is My Life) and later releasing her second single Doh Doh. As the Christmas holiday grows closer, she releases her third single From December. She released her fourth single Damn Love (그딴 사랑) on December 10, 2010.

2011: AB debut and controversy
She returned using AB (에이비) as the stage name for the Seureureuk (스르륵) album with the song "Slip", however it was banned by Munhwa Broadcasting Corporation (MBC), Korean Broadcasting System (KBS), Seoul Broadcasting System (SBS) after discovering its sexually suggestive content.

Discography

Studio albums

Single albums

Commercial Singles

Music video
 스르륵 (Slip) (2010)

References

External links
 
 Jung Yuri (정유리) on Hiphopplaya.com
 

1984 births
Living people
Musicians from Incheon
K-pop singers
South Korean dance musicians
South Korean women pop singers
Dongduk Women's University alumni
21st-century South Korean singers
21st-century South Korean women singers